Hu Jinghang (Chinese: 胡靖航; born 23 March 1997 in Ezhou) is a Chinese footballer who currently plays for Chinese Super League club Wuhan.

Club career
Hu Jinghang started his professional football career in July 2015 when he was promoted to Shanghai SIPG's first squad.  On 9 February 2016, Hu made his debut for Shanghai SIPG in the 2016 AFC Champions League qualifying play-off against Muangthong United, coming on as a substitute for Asamoah Gyan in the 90th minute. He made his Super League debut on 29 May 2016 in a 1–1 away draw against Guangzhou Evergrande, coming on for Lü Wenjun in the 80th minute.

On 28 February 2017, Hu was loaned to Henan Jianye for the 2017 season. On 5 March 2017, he made his debut for Henan in a 0–0 home draw against Hebei China Fortune. On 3 May 2017, he scored his first senior goal in the 2017 Chinese FA Cup in a 5–1 away win against China League Two club Shanghai Sunfun. His first league goal came on three days later on 6 May 2017 in a 3–2 win against Chongqing Lifan as Henan Jianye secured their first league victory of the season. He scored another goal on 5 August 2017, in a 2–2 away draw against Jiangsu Suning. On 24 September 2017, he scored his third league goal of the season against Shandong Luneng Taishan in a 2–1 win. Hu scored four goals in 29 appearances in the 2017 season and won the title of Chinese Football Association Young Player of the Year Award.

Hu returned to Shanghai SIPG in January 2018. On 9 July 2018, he was loaned to Henan Jianye for the second time until the end of 2018 season.

Career statistics 
Statistics accurate as of match played 9 January 2022.

Honours

Individual
Chinese Football Association Young Player of the Year: 2017

References

External links
 

1997 births
Living people
Chinese footballers
Footballers from Hubei
People from Ezhou
Shanghai Port F.C. players
Henan Songshan Longmen F.C. players
Wuhan F.C. players
Chinese Super League players
Association football forwards